Shadows in Paradise is a 1971 novel by Erich Maria Remarque. It is about a journalist, Robert Ross, who spent two years evading the Holocaust hiding in an art museum, flees from Europe to the United States and settles in New York. He meets a woman named Natasha, begins a new career as an art dealer and travels to Hollywood. After the war is over, Ross eventually leaves the States. The book was cited for having a tone of "lambent gray romanticism". An English translation by Ralph Manheim was published by Harcourt Brace Jovanovich in 1972.

References

1971 German novels
Novels by Erich Maria Remarque